Blay is a surname. Notable people with the surname include:

Andre Blay, American businessman, film producer and studio executive
Eddie Blay (1937–2006), Ghanaian boxer
Eva Alterman Blay (born 1937), Brazilian sociologist and politician
Freddie Blay (born 1942), Ghanaian lawyer and politician
George Blay (born 1980), Ghanaian footballer
J. Benibengor Blay (born 1915), Ghanaian journalist, writer, publisher and politician
Pep Blay (born 1966), Catalan writer, script writer and music journalist
Ruth Blay (died 1768), last woman executed in New Hampshire
Philippe Blay (born in April 1960) is a French musicologist

See also
Blay Whitby, British philosopher and technology ethicist
Bley